The Yewa River is a trans-boundary river between Republic of Benin and Nigeria, running along the Bight of Benin; at one point it crosses the border between the two countries. Other variants of the name are Yeoua, and, with accents, Yéoua and Yéwa. Its elevation is sea level. The Yewa's major sources are the Atan and Ilaro rivers. The Yewa empties into Badagry Creek which empties, in turn, into Lagos Harbor.

The river is in a West African tropical climate zone and is an important source of fishing for local inhabitants. An important aspect of the local fishing is the blue crab (Callinectes amnicola). In addition to fishing, the river is an important factor in logging and sand mining operations. Some of the plants that inhabit the river and its banks are sedges (such as Cyperus articulatus, Cyperus papyrus, and Paspalum vaginatum) and palms (such as Pandanus candelabrum, Raphia hookeri, and Phoenix reclinata). The name comes from the Yoruba deity, Yewa who was the goddess of this exact river as well as a deity over death, beauty, mystery, solitude, change, clarity and sorcery.

References

Rivers of Yorubaland
Rivers of Nigeria
Rivers of Benin